National Road 44 (abbreviated as EO44) is a single carriageway road in central Greece. It connects Thebes with Karystos on southern Euboea, via Chalcis and Eretria. The total length of the GR-44 is nearly 160 km. The highway lies in the regional units of Boeotia and Euboea.

Route
The west end of the GR-44 is in downtown Thebes, where it connects with the GR-3. It crosses Motorway 1 east of Thebes, and runs north to Chalcis. At Chalcis it crosses the Euripus Strait, and enters the island of Euboea. The GR-77 towards northern Euboea branches off. The GR-44 continues to the southeastern part of the island, passing along the south coast through the towns Eretria, Amarynthos and Aliveri. Beyond Aliveri it leaves the coast, and it runs south through Styra, ending in Karystos.

National Road 44 passes through the following places:

Thebes
Eleonas
Ritsona
Chalcis
Vasiliko
Eretria
Amarynthos
Aliveri
Zarakes
Styra
Karystos

Euboea
Roads in Central Greece
44